Me Myself & Rye... An Introduction To The Russian Futurists is a greatest hits compilation of songs from The Russian Futurists' first three albums.

Track listing 
All songs were written by Matthew Adam Hart.
 "Let's Get Ready to Crumble"
 "Paul Simon"
 "Our Pen's out of Ink"
 "Precious Metals"
 "It's Not Really Cold When It Snows"
 "The Science of the Seasons"
 "Hurtin' 4 Certain"
 "A Telegram from the Future"
 "2 Dots on a Map"
 "Your Big Brown Eyes and My Big Broke Heart"
 "C'mon"
 "Still Life"
 "A Mind's Dying Verse (You and the Wine)"

Track 6,10,11 and 13 from The Method of Modern Love (2001)

Tracks 1,4,5 and 8 from Let's Get Ready to Crumble (2003)

Tracks 2,3,7,9 and 12 from Our Thickness (2005)

2006 greatest hits albums
The Russian Futurists albums
Upper Class Recordings albums